Upsilon Ophiuchi is a triple star system in the equatorial constellation of Ophiuchus. It has a white hue and is faintly visible to the naked eye with an apparent visual magnitude of 4.62. The distance to this system is approximately 134 light years based on parallax. It is drifting closer with a radial velocity of −30.6 km/s.

The variable radial velocity of the brighter component was first observed by H. A. Abt in 1961. It is a double-lined spectroscopic binary system with an orbital period of 27.2 days and an eccentricity of 0.74. They have a combined magnitude of 4.71. Both components are similar stars with a combined  stellar classification of kA2hA5VmA5, and one or both are Am stars. The third component has an 82.8 year orbit with the inner pair at an eccentricity of 0.45. The system is a source for X-ray emission.

References

A-type main-sequence stars
Spectroscopic binaries
Triple star systems

Ophiuchus (constellation)
Ophiuchi, Upsilon
BD-08 4243
Ophiuchi, 03
148367
080628
6129
Am stars